Fülöp is Hungarian for Philip.

It may also refer to:

People
 Fülöp (surname), a Hungarian surname

Places
 Fülöp, Hungary, a village in Hajdú-Bihar county